Rumiko Takahashi's Urusei Yatsura, a Japanese anime and manga series, has six films and twelve OVA releases. During the television run of the series, four theatrical films were produced. Urusei Yatsura: Only You was directed by Mamoru Oshii and began showing in Japanese cinemas on February 11, 1983. Urusei Yatsura 2: Beautiful Dreamer was also directed by Mamoru Oshii and was released on February 11, 1984. Urusei Yatsura 3: Remember My Love was directed by Kazuo Yamazaki and released on January 26, 1985. Urusei Yatsura 4: Lum the Forever was directed again by Kazuo Yamazaki and released on February 22, 1986.

After the conclusion of the television series, two more films were produced. A year after the television series finished, Urusei Yatsura: The Final Chapter was directed by Satoshi Dezaki and was released on February 6, 1988 as a tenth anniversary celebration. It was shown as a double bill with a Maison Ikkoku film. The final film, Urusei Yatsura: Always My Darling was directed by Katsuhisa Yamada and was released on November 2, 1991. In North America, Beautiful Dreamer was released by Central Park Media. The remaining five films were released by AnimEigo in North America and MVM Films in the United Kingdom. After re-releasing Beautiful Dreamer in North America in 2018, Discotek Media acquired the rights to the other five films in 2020.

On September 24, 1985, the special Ryoko's September Tea Party was released, consisting of a mixture of previously broadcast footage along with 15 minutes of new material. Almost a year later on September 15, 1986,  Memorial Album was released, also mixing new and old footage. On July 18, 1987, the TV special Inaba the Dreammaker was broadcast before being released to video. It was followed by Raging Sherbet on December 2, 1988, and by Nagisa's Fiancé four days later on December 8, 1988. The Electric Household Guard was released on August 21, 1989 and followed by I Howl at the Moon on September 1, 1989. They were followed by Goat and Cheese on December 21, 1989 and Catch the Heart on December 27, 1989. Finally, Terror of Girly-Eyes Measles and Date with a Spirit were released on June 21, 1991. The OVA's were released in North America by AnimEigo who released them individually over 6 discs. AnimEigo produced dubs for the DVD releases.

On December 23, 2008, a new special was shown for the first time at the It's a Rumic World exhibition of Rumiko Takahashi's works. Entitled The Obstacle Course Swim Meet, it was the first animated content for the series in 17 years. On January 29, 2010, a boxset was released featuring all of the recent Rumiko Takahashi specials from the Rumic World exhibition. Entitled It's a Rumic World, the boxset contains The Obstacle Course Swim meet as well as a figure of Lum. The OVAs are not true OVAs, however, as they were all released theatrically prior to being released on video.

Only You

Release date: February 13, 1983, dubbed 2003.

 was released in 1983. The guest characters include Elle, another alien princess, who is in charge of Planet Elle.

6-year-old Ataru Moroboshi steps on Elle's shadow during an impromptu game of shadow-tag; in Elle's culture, this is viewed as a marriage proposal. Eleven years later, Elle returns to Earth in order to marry Ataru — by which time not only had he forgotten the events of his childhood, but he was also going out with Lum. The rest of the plot focuses on Lum's attempts to prevent the marriage.

The film was directed by Mamoru Oshii, who was mad at the many requests that the producer made of him to alter the film. Rumiko Takahashi considers this film her favorite and it is the most true to the original series.

A subtitled Laserdisc of the film was released by AnimEigo in North America on September 25, 1993.

Additional cast

Yoshiko Sakakibara as Elle
Hisako Kyouda as Babara
Yuko Maruyama as Rose
Kazuyo Aoki as Commander
Bin Shimada as Assistant Commander
Shiori as Elle (young)
Kazuki Suzuki as Child A
Nariko Fujieda as Child B

Beautiful Dreamer

Release date: February 11, 1984, dubbed 1996.

 is the second Urusei Yatsura film.

Like its predecessor, Beautiful Dreamer borrows heavily from the Japanese fairy tale of Urashima Tarō. Writer/director Mamoru Oshii, unsatisfied with how the first film, Only You, had developed, rejected the idea of catering to audience expectations and decided to do the film his own way. This almost caused Takahashi to reject the script because it deviated so far from the original story.

Even though the film is generally well-loved by English-speaking fans, when it was first released in Japan the response was not as favorable. Criticism was especially given towards Oshii, generally from the fan community. As a result, Oshii quit working on the production of Urusei Yatsura and went on to do other more experimental projects. Despite this, the film has been referred to by most fans as the best film in the Urusei Yatsura series.

Additional cast

Takuya Fujioka as Mujaki

Remember My Love
Release date: January 26, 1985, dubbed 2003.

 is the third Urusei Yatsura film. The guest characters are:

 Ruu, a mysterious boy bent on fixing Lum's life
 Lahla, Ruu's tutor, who tries to get things set straight

The third film finds Ataru transformed into a pink hippopotamus, which sends Lum chasing after the  wicked magician responsible, with catastrophic results. With Lum gone, her friends decide that there is no reason to remain, and so Tomobiki slowly returns to normal. The highlight of the film is a high speed chase scene with an angry Lum flying after the mysterious Ruu through the city at night and into a hall of mirrors (and illusion). Ataru's true feelings for Lum are probably more obvious in this film than any of the others.

The film grossed  at the Japanese box office, becoming the year's eighth highest-grossing Japanese film. A subtitled Laserdisc was released by AnimEigo in North America on January 19, 1994.

Additional cast

Mitsuo Iwata as Ruu
Sumi Shimamoto as Lahla
Masako Sugaya as Oshima
Hisako Kyouda as Old Lady

Lum the Forever
Release date: February 22, 1986, dubbed 2004.

 is the fourth Urusei Yatsura film. Guest characters include Tarōzakura, the great cherry tree.

A horror film production comes to town, casting the cast of the series as extras in the production. But when the director orders the cutting down of a cursed great cherry tree called Tarōzakura, the remains of the tree curses Lum by way of removing her horns and powers. The quest to restore Lum's demon powers puts Ataru at odds with the spirit of the tree, who forces the cast of the slasher film to believe they are their roles as it seeks vengeance upon the film crew.

There was also released on 15 February 1986 a  documentation about the film.

Additional cast

Mugihito as Mendou's Father
Bin Shimada as Tobimaro Mizunokoji
Sumi Shimamoto as Asuka Mizunokoji

The Final Chapter
Release date: February 6, 1988, dubbed 2004.

 is the fifth Urusei Yatsura film. Guest characters include:

 Rupa, Lum's fiancé
 Carla, is said to be Rupa's betrothed.

The fifth film is an animated adaptation of the final story of the manga and is also the official ending of the anime series, in which Lum and Ataru must repeat the game of tag played out in the first episode of the television series, or the Earth will be infested with mushrooms larger than buildings. Further, should Ataru lose, Lum will leave forever and everyone's memories will be changed so that they don't remember she, or her friends, were ever there. Finally, Lum refuses to allow Ataru to win unless he says to her those three words, "I love you", that he has steadfastly refused to say over the entire series. Maison Ikkoku: The Final Chapter was also released on the same date as this film.

Additional cast

Hirotaka Suzuoki as Inaba
Kaneto Shiozawa as Rupa
You Inoue as Carla
Kōichi Kitamura as Upa (Rupa’s grandfather)

Always My Darling
Release date: August 18, 1991, dubbed 2005.

 (alternately Forever My Darling) is the sixth Urusei Yatsura film and the tenth anniversary special. It is not the end of the anime series despite coming after The Final Chapter. The character designer and animation director for the film was Kumiko Takahashi. The regular theatrical release in Japan was the November 2, 1991 and it was shown on a double bill with the first Ranma ½ feature, Big Trouble in Nekonron, China. Guest characters include Lupika, another alien princess.

Lupika, an alien princess, is in love with a tofu seller. To make him love her too (at least, announce his love. He obviously fears the social taboo of a tofu vendor marrying a princess), she needs to get a love potion, which is in a certain temple. Legend has it that the only person that can obtain this love potion is the most lecherous man in the universe. That man turns out to be Ataru Moroboshi. Lupika kidnaps Ataru to make him get the potion, and Lum and her friends go out to search for Ataru.

This film has been referred to by some fans as the worst of the series.

Due to this, this is the last animated released content for the franchise until 2008 with the 12th OVA.

A subtitled Laserdisc was released by AnimEigo in North America on July 27, 1994.

Additional cast

Naoko Matsui as Lupika
Shinnosuke Furumoto as Rio
Isamu Tanonaka as Commander

OVA releases

Urusei Yatsura also has a number of direct-to-market video releases which include stories not covered in the TV series or films. However, they are not true OVAs as all of them were released in theaters prior to being released on video. All but one of these were released after the ending of the series, so popularity may have also been a factor in the continued release of new animation.

Sources:

References

Further reading

External links
AnimEigo Urusei Yatsura product page

1985 anime films
1985 anime OVAs
1986 anime OVAs
1987 anime OVAs
1988 anime films
1988 anime OVAs
1989 anime OVAs
1991 anime OVAs
2008 anime OVAs
Urusei Yatsura
Shogakukan franchises
Anime film series
Anime films based on manga
Comedy anime and manga
Comedy film series
Discotek Media
Extraterrestrials in anime and manga
Film series introduced in 1983
Films based on works by Rumiko Takahashi
Japanese animated science fiction films
Japanese film series
Lists of anime films
Madhouse (company)
Magic Bus (studio)
Pierrot (company)
Science fiction film series
Studio Deen
Sunrise (company)
Animated films about extraterrestrial life